The Kalaburagi Ring Road is a  long, four-laned ring road in the city of Kalaburagi.

All trucks, buses, and heavy vehicles in the town are diverted via the Ring Road.

See also 
 Mysore Ring Road

References 

Ring roads in India
Kalaburagi
Roads in Kalaburagi district